Thomas Biskup (born 2 July 1971) is a German software engineer and computer scientist. He is the creator and developer of Ancient Domains of Mystery, a popular roguelike video game first released in 1994.

Biskup is currently CEO of the German software firm QuinScape. He lives in Witten, Germany.

References

External links
RPGVault interview
Personal website

German software engineers
Living people
German game designers
1971 births
German computer scientists
Engineers from North Rhine-Westphalia
21st-century German scientists
21st-century German engineers
People from Witten